Prof. Dr. Sabu Thomas (born 14 March 1962) is an Indian professor who is serving as the vice-chancellor of Mahatma Gandhi University, Kerala. He is also a full professor (25 March 1998 onwards) of Polymer Science and Engineering at the School of Chemical Sciences. He was the Pro-Vice Chancellor of Mahatma Gandhi University, Kerala during the period of 31 August 2017 to 31 August 2018, Director of School of Chemical Science during the period of 1 November 2010 to 31 December 2013.  Hon. Director of    International & Inter-University Centre for Nanoscience and Nanotechnology during the period of 28 March 2009 to 11 September 2015, 2 February 2016 to 11 October 2017.

Early life 
Sabu Thomas was born on 14 March 1962.He completed his schooling at Kumaranalloor Devi Vilasom HSS. He studied pre-degree at CMS College, Kottayam and then obtained BSc Degree in Chemistry from Kuriakose Elias College, Mannanam, Kottayam in 1980 and Bachelor of Technology Degree in Polymer Science and Rubber Technology from Cochin University of Science and Technology in 1983. He received his PhD from Indian Institute of Technology Kharagpur in 1987.

Academic research 
His areas of academic research include polymer nanocomposites and cellulose nanocomposites. He is the editor of the Elsevier journal Nano-Structures & Nano-Objects.

Awards and recognition 
In 2015, he received his first Docteur Honoris Causa from University of Southern Brittany in Lorient, France. In 2016, he received his second Doctorate honoris causa from University of Lorraine, France. He was awarded the Fellow of the Royal Society of Chemistry, London, FRSC in 2012. He received the Bronze Medal of the Chemical Research Society of India and the MRSI Medal of the Material Research Society of India in 2013. He was the recipient of Fulbright-Nehru International Education Administrators Award 2017. He received TRiLA Academician of the year 2018 award.

Academic Identity 
 Google Scholar : Prof. (Dr.) Sabu Thomas – Google Scholar Citations
 Scopus : Scopus preview – Scopus – Author details (Thomas, Sabu)
 ORCID : ORCID
 ResearcherID : Prof. (Dr.) Sabu Thomas  | Publons
 Vidwan : Vidwan | Profile Page

Books 

Royal Society of Chemistry
 Biobased Aerogels: Polysaccharide and Protein-based Materials,2018 
 Natural Polymers: Volume 1: Composites, 2012

Elsevier
 Advances in Polymer Processing, 1st Edition, From Macro- To Nano- Scales, Woodhead Publishing, 2009

John Wiley & Sons

 Advanced Materials for Electromagnetic Shielding,Fundamentals, Properties, and Applications,2018

CRC Press
 Methodologies and Applications for Analytical and Physical Chemistry, 2018

Nova Publishers

 Polymer Nanocomposite Research Advances, 2008
 Progress in Polymer Nanocomposite Research, 2008

References 

Cochin University of Science and Technology alumni
Indian polymer scientists and engineers
Living people
1960 births
IIT Kharagpur alumni
20th-century Indian engineers
Academic staff of Mahatma Gandhi University, Kerala